The 2007–08 season was ACF Fiorentina's 82nd season in Italian football in their existence and their 70th season in the first-tier of Italian football, Serie A. Having finished 6th the previous season with a tally of 58 points, La Viola earned qualification into the first round of the 2007–08 UEFA Cup.

The 2007–08 season was a very successful one for the Viola. They reached the semi-finals of the UEFA Cup where they were beaten on penalties by Rangers and finished fourth in Serie A ahead of Milan, thus qualifying for the 2008–09 UEFA Champions League.

Players

Squad information

Transfers

In

Summer transfer window

Winter transfer window

Out

Summer transfer window

Winter transfer window

On loan

Competitions

Overall

Last updated: 18 May 2008

Serie A

League table

Results summary

Results by round

Matches

Coppa Italia

Round of 16

Quarter-finals

UEFA Cup

First round

Group stage

Final phase

Round of 32

Round of 16

Quarter-finals

Semi-finals

Statistics

Appearances and goals

|-
|colspan="10"|Players sold or loaned out during the 2008 winter transfer window:

|}

Goalscorers

Last updated:

Clean sheets

Last updated:

Disciplinary record

Last updated:

References

ACF Fiorentina seasons
Fiorentina